Eclipta is a genus of beetles in the family Cerambycidae, containing the following species:

 Eclipta aberlenci (Tavakilian & Peñaherrera-Leiva, 2005)
 Eclipta aegrota (Bates, 1872)
 Eclipta amabilis (Melzer, 1934)
 Eclipta amanoaphila (Penaherrera-Leiva & Tavakilian, 2003)
 Eclipta anoguttata (Bates, 1873)
 Eclipta astrigae (Tavakilian & Penaherrera-Leiva, 2003)
 Eclipta atripes (Fisher, 1952)
 Eclipta bauhiniae (Penaherrera-Leiva & Tavakilian, 2004)
 Eclipta bilineaticollis (Zajciw, 1965)
 Eclipta bipunctata (Melzer, 1934)
 Eclipta bistriaticollis (Zajciw, 1965)
 Eclipta bivittata (Fuchs, 1961)
 Eclipta bivitticollis (Fisher, 1952)
 Eclipta brachialis (Bates, 1873)
 Eclipta brasiliensis (Fisher, 1947)
 Eclipta brevipennis (Melzer, 1934)
 Eclipta castanea (Bates, 1873)
 Eclipta championella (Bates, 1880)
 Eclipta collarti (Fuchs, 1959)
 Eclipta costipennis (Giesbert, 1991)
 Eclipta cribripennis (Bates, 1873)
 Eclipta curtipennis (Zajciw, 1966)
 Eclipta cyanea (Bates, 1885)
 Eclipta discolor (Gounelle, 1911)
 Eclipta eirene (Newman, 1841)
 Eclipta eperuaphila (Tavakilian & Peñaherrera-Leiva, 2005)
 Eclipta erythrodera (Bates, 1873)
 Eclipta eunomia (Newman, 1841)
 Eclipta fanchonae (Tavakilian & Penaherrera-Leiva, 2003)
 Eclipta faurei (Penaherrera-Leiva & Tavakilian, 2003)
 Eclipta flavicollis (Bates, 1873)
 Eclipta fritschei (Gounelle, 1913)
 Eclipta giuglarisi (Penaherrera-Leiva & Tavakilian, 2004)
 Eclipta gracilis (Fisher, 1952)
 Eclipta guianensis (Penaherrera-Leiva & Tavakilian, 2004)
 Eclipta igniventris (Giesbert, 1991)
 Eclipta lanuginosa (Bates, 1873)
 Eclipta lateralis (Fisher, 1952)
 Eclipta lauraceae (Penaherrera-Leiva & Tavakilian, 2004)
 Eclipta liturifera (Bates, 1873)
 Eclipta malacodermoides (Penaherrera-Leiva & Tavakilian, 2003)
 Eclipta malthinoides (Bates, 1870)
 Eclipta melzeri (Zajciw, 1967)
 Eclipta minuens (Giesbert, 1991)
 Eclipta monteverdensis (Giesbert, 1991)
 Eclipta nais (Gounelle, 1911)
 Eclipta nigriventris (Melzer, 1934)
 Eclipta notaticollis (Gounelle, 1911)
 Eclipta notatipes (Tavakilian & Peñaherrera-Leiva, 2005)
 Eclipta pallidicornis (Zajciw, 1966)
 Eclipta perplexa (Gounelle, 1911)
 Eclipta picturata (Gounelle, 1911)
 Eclipta pilosipes (Penaherrera-Leiva & Tavakilian, 2004)
 Eclipta prolixa (Bates, 1873)
 Eclipta pseudoruficollis (Tavakilian & Peñaherrera-Leiva, 2005)
 Eclipta quadrispinosa (Gounelle, 1913)
 Eclipta ramulicola (Gounelle, 1911)
 Eclipta romani (Aurivillius, 1919)
 Eclipta ruficollis (Bates, 1870)
 Eclipta sallaei (Bates, 1885)
 Eclipta seabrai (Zajciw, 1960)
 Eclipta semiflammea (Gounelle, 1911)
 Eclipta seminigra (Gounelle, 1911)
 Eclipta signaticollis (Melzer, 1922)
 Eclipta socia (Melzer, 1934)
 Eclipta subcastanea (Zajciw, 1966)
 Eclipta taraleaphila (Tavakilian & Penaherrera-Leiva, 2003)
 Eclipta thoracica Bates, 1873
 Eclipta transversemaculata (Tavakilian & Peñaherrera-Leiva, 2005)
 Eclipta vasconezi (Penaherrera-Leiva & Tavakilian, 2004)
 Eclipta vicina (Melzer, 1927)
 Eclipta vitticollis (Bates, 1873)

References

 
Rhinotragini